Southwestern Antioquia is a subregion in the Colombian Department of Antioquia. The region is made up of 24 municipalities and is part of the Colombian Coffee Region.

Municipalities

 Amagá
 Andes
 Angelópolis
 Betania
 Betulia
 Caicedo
 Caramanta
 Ciudad Bolívar
 Concordia
 Fredonia
 Hispania
 Jardín
 Jericó
 La Pintada
 Montebello
 Pueblorrico
 Salgar
 Santa Bárbara
 Támesis
 Tarso
 Titiribí
 Urrao
 Valparaíso
 Venecia

Regions of Antioquia Department